Libyan Americans are United States citizens of Libyan descent or Libyan citizens who also have United States (US) citizenship. 

Most Libyan Americans speak Arabic and English. 
According to the 2000 Census there were 2,979 Americans who claimed Libyan ancestry. 

Some Libyan American associations are the Libyan American Organization, Libyan American Friendship Association (LAFA), Libyan American Association in Southern California and Libyan American Association of Georgia.

The Libyan American Organization have as goal the Libya defense, promote political awareness among its members and integrate to all community in the association. In addition, the organization wants to improve education, health care and infrastructure of Libya. The association hopes to have the community support in order to "rebuilding our beloved country".

Libyan American Friendship Association (LAFA) have as goal promote friendship between the Libyan and U.S., making dialogue the two peoples by holding international meetings and symposia, for the creation of programs and projects that help both peoples to establish ties. The organization celebrates coordinate visits between institutions of "economic, social, scientific and national / civil joint".

Notable people 
 Saddeka Arebi (d. 2007), social anthropologist, author
 Don Coscarelli (b. 1954), film director, producer, screenwriter
 Sadeg Faris, engineer, entrepreneur
 Fadwa El Gallal, journalist
 Mohamed Hrezi (b. 1991), marathon runner
 Khaled Mattawa (b. 1964), poet
 Esam Omeish (b. 1967), surgeon
 Noor Tagouri (b. 1993), journalist, activist, motivational speaker
 Khalifa Haftar (b. 1943), general, commander of the Libyan National Army

See also

 Libya–United States relations
 Arab Americans
 Berber Americans
 North Africans in the United States
 Libyan Canadians

References

Further reading
 Stabin, Tova. "Libyan Americans." Gale Encyclopedia of Multicultural America, edited by Thomas Riggs, (3rd ed., vol. 3, Gale, 2014), pp. 101-109. online

External links 
 The American-Libyan Council 
 Libyan American Organization

North Africans in the United States
 

Arab American
 
American